Kellie Jolly Harper (born May 3, 1977) is an American basketball coach who is currently the head women's basketball coach of the Tennessee Lady Vols. Prior to coaching at Tennessee, she served as head coach of Missouri State,  NC State, and Western Carolina.

Playing career
Born Kellie Jean Jolly in Sparta, Tennessee, she is a graduate of White County High School in Sparta, where she earned many honors as a high school basketball player and ranked third academically in her graduating class.

In college, she was one of the starting point guards for the Tennessee Lady Volunteers during their three consecutive NCAA women's national championships from 1996 to 1998. In 1997, Harper was named to the Final Four All Tournament team.

Coaching career
On January 28, 2008, Kellie earned her 66th win, passing Beth Dunkenberger as the second winningest women's basketball coach in Western Carolina history with a 60–49 victory over College of Charleston at the Ramsey Center.

NC State athletic director Debbie Yow fired Harper on March 26, 2013, after Harper compiled an overall four-year record for the Wolfpack of 70–64 but only 23–39 within the Atlantic Coast Conference.

On April 10, 2013, Harper was named head coach of the Missouri State Lady Bears, a member of the Missouri Valley Conference. Beginning with the 2014–15 season, she led the Lady Bears to five consecutive top-three finishes in the MVC and five consecutive postseason trips, including berths in the NCAA Tournament in 2016 and 2019. 
 
The 2018–19 season proved to be a career year for Harper. The Lady Bears finished the regular season 20–9 (16–2 MVC), after starting the season 1–7. Harper was voted the Missouri Valley Conference Coach of the Year for her efforts. She became the first Missouri State coach to win the award since Cheryl Burnett in 1994. After defeating top-seeded and nationally ranked #24 Drake Bulldogs in the Missouri Valley Conference tournament Finals, Harper's team received an 11–seed in the Chicago Region. Harper guided the Lady Bears to the Sweet Sixteen with upset wins over 6–seed DePaul and 3–seed Iowa State Cyclones, in games in Ames, Iowa. The Lady Bears fell to 2–seed Stanford in the Sweet Sixteen. Harper was named the Kay Yow Coach of the Year award winner for 2019.

Personal life
In 1999 she married Jon Harper, a member of her coaching staff at Western Carolina, North Carolina State, Missouri State, and Tennessee. She has two children, Jackson and Kiley.

Head coaching record

References

External links
Tennessee Lady Vols bio
Missouri State Lady Bears bio
Western Carolina Catamounts bio
NC State Wolfpack bio

1977 births
Living people
American women's basketball coaches
American women's basketball players
Basketball coaches from Tennessee
Basketball players from Tennessee
Missouri State Lady Bears basketball coaches
NC State Wolfpack women's basketball coaches
Point guards
Tennessee Lady Volunteers basketball players
Tennessee Lady Volunteers basketball coaches
Western Carolina Catamounts women's basketball coaches